Abie's Irish Rose is a 1928 early talking (part-talkie) film directed by Victor Fleming and starring Charles "Buddy" Rogers, Nancy Carroll, Jean Hersholt, and J. Farrell MacDonald. It is based on the 1922 play Abie's Irish Rose by Anne Nichols. The film was later remade in 1946.

Plot
A Jewish boy, Abie Levy (Rogers), falls in love with and secretly marries Rosemary Murphy (Carroll), an Irish Catholic girl, but lies to his family, saying that she's Jewish. The fathers of both bride and groom are at first religiously bigoted toward the other but with the birth of twin grandchildren, their antagonism fades.

Cast
Charles "Buddy" Rogers as Abie Levy
Nancy Carroll as Rosemary Murphy
Jean Hersholt as Solomon Levy
J. Farrell MacDonald as Patrick Murphy
Bernard Gorcey as Isaac Cohen
Ida Kramer as Mrs. Isaac Cohen
Nick Cogley as Father Whalen
Camillus Pretal as Rabbi Jacob Samuels
Rosa Rosanova as Sarah

Preservation status
Only reels 3-6 and 9-12 survive of this film in a silent incomplete copy. There may also be an incomplete copy of reel 8, unverified. All of the surviving reels of the film are held at The Library of Congress in Washington D.C. and the Vitaphone soundtrack discs for the film still exist complete has been restored by the UCLA Film and Television Archive.

See also 
 The Cohens and Kellys: A film with a similar plot
 Nichols v. Universal Pictures Corp.

References

External links

Abie's Irish Rose at Virtual History

American films based on plays
Films directed by Victor Fleming
American black-and-white films
1928 films
Transitional sound films
American silent feature films
American interfaith romance films
Christian and Jewish interfaith dialogue
1928 comedy films
American comedy films
Films with screenplays by Herman J. Mankiewicz
Films with screenplays by Jules Furthman
Religious comedy films
1920s American films
Silent American comedy films